Endicott River Wilderness is a  wilderness area in the U.S. state of Alaska.  Designated by the United States Congress in 1980 in a provision of the Alaska National Interest Lands Conservation Act, it is located within the Tongass National Forest and is bordered by Glacier Bay Wilderness within Glacier Bay National Park on the west.

See also
List of U.S. Wilderness Areas
Wilderness Act

References

External links
Endicott River Wilderness - Tongass National Forest
Endicott River Wilderness - Wilderness.net
Endicott River Wilderness, Alaska - GORP

Protected areas of Haines Borough, Alaska
Wilderness areas of the Tongass National Forest
IUCN Category Ib
ANILCA establishments
Protected areas established in 1980
1980 establishments in Alaska